Rice Lake is an unincorporated place and railway point in geographic Rice Township in Unorganized Kenora District in northwestern Ontario, Canada,  east of the border with the province of Manitoba.

Rice Lake station is in the community. The station is on the Canadian National Railway transcontinental main line, between the Manitoba border to the west and White to the east, and is served by Via Rail transcontinental Canadian trains.

References

Communities in Kenora District